Lonnie R. Qualls (born c. 1932) is a former American football and baseball coach. He served as the head football coach at the College of the Ozarks—now known as the University of the Ozarks—in Clarksville, Arkansas from  1962 to 1965, compiling a record of 2–29–2. He was the final head football coach at Ozarks as the program was discontinued after the 1965 season.

A native of Clarksville, Qualls graduated from Clarksville High School, where he competed football, basketball, baseball, and track. He then attended the College of the Ozarks, where he played football, basketball, and baseball. Qualls played football as a fullback, rushing for 2,106 yards and scoring 182 points in his career at the school. He earned first-team all-Arkansas Intercollegiate Conference (AIC) honors in each of his four seasons and won the AIC's Back of the Year award as a senior in 1954.

Qualls began his coaching career at Clarksville High School before returning to the College of the Ozarks, where he taught and coached a number of sports—baseball, tennis, bowling, soccer, and cross country in addition to football. The baseball field at Ozarks was named in honor of Qualls in 2005.

Head coaching record

College football

References

Year of birth missing (living people)
1930s births
Living people
American football fullbacks
American men's basketball players
Ozarks Eagles baseball coaches
Ozarks Eagles baseball players
Ozarks Mountaineers football coaches
Ozarks Mountaineers football players
Ozarks Eagles men's basketball players
College cross country coaches in the United States
College men's soccer coaches in the United States
College tennis coaches in the United States
High school football coaches in Arkansas
People from Clarksville, Arkansas
Coaches of American football from Arkansas
Players of American football from Arkansas
Baseball coaches from Arkansas
Baseball players from Arkansas
Basketball players from Arkansas